The Effingham County School District is a public school district in Effingham County, Georgia, United States, based in Springfield. It serves the communities of Guyton, Rincon, and Springfield.

Schools
The Effingham County School District has eight elementary schools, three middle schools, and two high schools.

Elementary schools 
Blandford Elementary School
Ebenezer Elementary School
Guyton Elementary School
Marlow Elementary School
Rincon Elementary School
Sand Hill Elementary School
South Effingham Elementary School
Springfield Elementary School

Middle schools
Ebenezer Middle School
Effingham County Middle School
South Effingham Middle School

High schools
Effingham County High School
South Effingham High School

Other
Effingham College and Career Academy

References

External links

Pilgrim Missionary Baptist Normal and Industrial Institute historical marker

School districts in Georgia (U.S. state)
Education in Effingham County, Georgia